Carle or Carlé is a surname. Notable people with the name include:

Andrea Cosima Carle, whose stage name is Maggie Mae (1960 – 2021), German singer
Barbara Carle (born 1958), French-American poet, critic, translator and Italianist
David Carle (born 1989), American ice hockey coach
Derek Carle (born 1973), Zimbabwean cricketer
Eric Carle (1929–2021), American designer, illustrator, and writer of children's books
Erwin Carlé, know by the pseudonym Erwin Rosen (1876 - 1923), German author and journalist
Frankie Carle (1903–2001), American pianist and bandleader
Jerry Carle (1923–2014), American football, basketball, and baseball player and coach
Gabrielle Carle (born 1998), Canadian soccer forward
Gilles Carle (1928–2009), French Canadian director, screenwriter and painter
Glenn Carle, American writer and former intelligence officer
Jean Carle (born 1962), Canadian former civil servant, business executive, and Liberal Party operative
Jean-Claude Carle (1948 – 2019), French politician
Jean-Louis Carle (1925 – 1975), French cyclist
Leo Carle (born 1980), Australian football and Futsal player
Les Carle, the first stage name of English voice actor Ken Barrie (1933-2016)
María Lourdes Carlé (born 2000), Argentine tennis player
Mathieu Carle (born 1987), Canadian professional ice hockey defenceman
Matt Carle (born 1984), American former professional ice hockey defenseman
Nichole de Carle (born 1984), British fashion designer
Nick Carle (born 1981), retired Australian soccer midfielder
Pontus Carle (born 1955), contemporary artist
Richard Carle (1871–1941), American stage and film actor
Robin H. Carle (born 1955), American civil servant
Shane Carle (born 1991), American baseball player
Sophie Carle  (born 1964), Luxembourgian actress and singer
Stesha Carle (born 1984), American rower

Other
Carle Honors, American children's picture book award named for illustrator Eric Carle
Eric Carle Museum of Picture Book Art

See also

Acosta Carlez
Carle (given name)
Carlee
Carli (given name)
Carlie
Carlye J. Hughes
De Carle